The 2013 Minneapolis mayoral election was held on November 5, 2013 to elect the mayor of Minneapolis for a four-year term. This was the second mayoral election in the city's history to use instant-runoff voting, popularly known as ranked choice voting, first implemented in the city's 2009 elections. Municipal elections in Minnesota are nonpartisan, although candidates are able to identify with a political party on the ballot. After incumbent Mayor R. T. Rybak announced in late 2012 that he would not seek a fourth term, 35 candidates began campaigns to replace him. Many of these candidates sought the endorsement of the Minneapolis unit of the Minnesota Democratic–Farmer–Labor Party (DFL), though the convention ultimately ended with no endorsement.

Although she did not win enough votes to be victorious on the first ballot, DFLer Betsy Hodges held a "commanding" lead and was "poised" to be elected following completion of vote tabulations. Second-place finisher Mark Andrew effectively conceded on election night, saying that it was unlikely that he would overcome Hodges' lead. Hodges was elected in the 33rd round after two days of vote tabulations.

Background
Minneapolis' 2009 elections were the first in the city's history to implement a system of ranked choice voting (RCV), whereby voters ranked up to their first three choices for an office instead of voting for just one. Turnout that year was, however, the city's lowest in decades with under 46,000 ballots being cast. Incumbent mayor R.T. Rybak won over 33,000 of those votes on the first round of voting, surpassing 22,579 which was the threshold of 50% of ballots cast plus one that were necessary to win the election. A 2010 report prepared for the Minneapolis Elections Department by David Schultz and Kristi Rendahl of Hamline University determined that it was unclear whether the RCV system had met its stated goals of "increasing voter turnout, encouraging more candidates to run, [and] promoting more support for third party candidates."

On December 27, 2012, Rybak, who had been in office since 2001, announced that he would not seek a fourth term as mayor.

Candidates

The official filing period with the City of Minneapolis for mayoral candidacy began on July 30 and lasted for two weeks, until August 13. Candidates had until August 15 to withdraw and have their names taken off of the ballot. In March 2013, City Council member Cam Gordon proposed raising the fee to run for mayor to $500, a move intended to "discourag[e] frivolous candidates" according to the Star Tribune. However, the fee remained at $20 for the 2013 filing period. While the election is officially nonpartisan, there was a space on the affidavits of candidacy for candidates to declare their "Political Party or Principle".

A total of 35 people declared their candidacy for mayor, a number that Minneapolis elections officials claimed hadn't been seen on the ballot since at least the 1980s, if not before. Hamline University's Schultz commented that the crowded race would make it difficult for candidates to get name recognition, "[e]specially for some of those candidates who fall further down on the list because they probably don't have a lot of money, and they probably aren't going to get invited to debates." An article in MinnPost suggested that the majority of candidates' campaigns would not have a lot of funding with which to work, nor would they be well organized.

Gregg A. Iverson was the first of six candidates to submit their affidavits of candidacy on July 30, the first day of filing. Meanwhile, three candidates waited until August 13, the final day of the filing period, to submit their affidavits, including Cyd Gorman who was the last to file. No candidates who registered with the Elections Department took advantage of the ability to withdraw their candidacies.

In 2014, as a result of the high number of candidates, city voters approved an amendment to the city charter that raised filing requirements to either $500 or 500 signatures.

Declared
A candidate's self-identified political party does not indicate endorsement by that party. Political party endorsements are listed in the "Political party endorsements" section below.

 Mark V. Anderson, Simplify Government
 Merrill Anderson, Jobs & Justice
 Mark Andrew, DFL
 Neal Baxter, Independent
 Troy Benjegerdes, Local Energy/Food
 Alicia K. Bennett, DFL
 Edmund Bernard Bruyere, Legacy-Next Generation
 Bob "Again" Carney, Jr., Demand Transit Revolution
 Jackie Cherryhomes, DFL
 Christopher Clark, Libertarian Party of Minnesota
 Dan Cohen, Jobs Downtown Casino
 James Everett, Green Party of Minnesota
 Bob Fine, DFL
 Cyd Gorman, Police Reform
 Mike Gould, DFL
 Kurtis W. Hanna, Minnesota Pirate Party
 John Leslie Hartwig, Independent
 Betsy Hodges, DFL
 Gregg A. Iverson, DFL
 Bill Kahn, Last Minneapolis Mayor
 Jaymie Kelly, Stop Foreclosures Now
 Tony Lane, Socialist Workers Party
 Doug Mann, Green Party of Minnesota
 Abdul M. Rahaman "The Rock", We the people...
 Joshua Rea, End Homelessness Now
 Don Samuels, DFL
 Ole Savior, Republican Party of Minnesota
 Captain Jack Sparrow, Count All Rankings
 James "Jimmy" L. Stroud, Jr., The people's choice
 Jeffrey Alan Wagner, DFL
 John Charles Wilson, Lauraist Communist
 Cam Winton, independent responsible inclusive
 Stephanie Woodruff, DFL
 Rahn V. Workcuff, Independence Party of Minnesota
 Christopher Robin Zimmerman, Libertarian

Political party endorsements

Gallery

Not pictured: Mark V. Anderson, Neal Baxter, Alicia K. Bennett, Edmund Bernard Bruyere, Bob Carney, Jr., Christopher Clark, James Everett, Cyd Gorman, Mike Gould, John Leslie Hartwig, Jaymie Kelly, Tony Lane, Doug Mann, Abdun M. Rahaman, Joshua Rea, James L. Stroud, Jr., Jeffrey Alan Wagner, Rahn V. Workcuff

Withdrawn

 On June 19, DFL City Council member Gary Schiff announced an end to his campaign and backed Hodges.
 Jim Thomas announced his departure from the race on August 12 and put his support behind Andrew.

Declined

 John Erwin, Minneapolis Park and Recreation Board Commissioner
 Jim Graves, businessman and Democratic nominee for the 6th congressional district in 2012
 Tom Hoch, President and CEO of the Hennepin Theatre Trust
 R. T. Rybak, incumbent mayor
 Hussein Samatar, Minneapolis School Board member (died August 25, 2013)
 Tina Smith, chief of staff for Governor Mark Dayton

Campaigns

Announcements
Almost a month before Rybak announced that he intended to leave office, DFL City Council member Betsy Hodges of Minneapolis' thirteenth ward declared that she would run for mayor. Her plans, however, were contingent upon whether Rybak would elect to run for a fourth time. When Rybak made his announcement in December 2012, Hodges formally proclaimed her candidacy.

The Star Tribune reported in early December 2012 that former DFL City Council President Jackie Cherryhomes was also considering a bid for the mayor's office. Cherryhomes last held office in 2001, but remained involved at the Minneapolis City Hall as a lobbyist. Like Hodges, she only intended to run if Rybak opted not to and, like Hodges, she announced that she would run promptly after Rybak declared he would not, on December 27.

DFL City Council member Gary Schiff from Minneapolis' ninth ward was also mulling a mayoral run in mid-December when he filed paperwork to form a committee that could support his potential candidacy. Unlike Hodges and Cherryhomes, Schiff stated that whether he would run or not would probably not be contingent upon what Rybak decided to do. On January 29, Schiff announced that he would seek the mayor's seat.

Fifth ward City Council member Don Samuels, another DFLer, was considering running for the office shortly after Rybak announced that he wouldn't run again. Samuels had served on the City Council for a decade at that time and had most recently run but dropped out of a race for Hennepin County Commissioner. A day after Schiff made his candidacy official, Samuels entered the race as well, becoming the third sitting member of City Council to do so.

Mark Andrew, formerly a Hennepin County Commissioner and the chair of the DFL from 1995 until 1997, expressed in early January that he was "very interested" in potentially vying for the position of mayor. Since leaving public office, Andrew had begun GreenMark, an environmental marketing firm. He officially declared his candidacy on February 7, 2013, acknowledging his late entrance into the race relative to some of his opponents.

Running as an independent, attorney Cam Winton is mentioned in a Star Tribune article dated March 20, 2013. Winton, a Republican, stated that he did not intend to seek the DFL endorsement, making him the only candidate declared at the time to do so.

Dan Cohen, a Republican former City Council member, said on May 28 that he would run for mayor if the DFL failed to agree on an endorsement. Cohen, who sits on Minneapolis' Charter and Planning Commissions, was a Council member in the 1960s He last ran for mayor in 1969, losing to Charles Stenvig. Cohen formally declared his candidacy on June 18.

Pre-convention debates
The first debate between mayoral candidates took place on March 27 at the University of Minnesota's Humphrey School of Public Affairs. Moderated by professor of political science Larry Jacobs, as well as some of his students, the debate included Andrew, Hodges, Schiff, Cherryhomes, and Samuels, noted by Jacobs as being the "leading DFL candidates". Winton observed the debate from the audience but was not invited to participate as he was not seeking the DFL endorsement. Candidates fielded questions on the new Vikings stadium (responding anywhere from heavily in favor of the project to staunchly against it), property taxes (no candidate accepted a pledge from Jacobs not to raise them), how to revitalize North Minneapolis, and their qualifications for the job of mayor.

DFL endorsement convention

An endorsement convention was held by the DFL on June 15, 2013, at the Minneapolis Convention Center. All candidates then declared with the exception of Winton (Andrew, Cherryhomes, Hodges, Samuels, Schiff, and Thomas) sought the nomination and were present at the event. Sixty percent of delegate votes were required to receive the endorsement.

During the first round of voting, Jim Thomas, Cheryhomes, and Samuels were eliminated as each failed to secure the ten percent of the vote required to move on to the second round. Schiff was eliminated after the second ballot, leaving Andrew and Hodges. Andrew came first in every round of voting but never reached the 60 percent threshold. Hodges invited her delegates outside of the Convention Center to eat pizza. Their absence meant that a quorum was not present at the convention and so, on the fifth ballot, the convention ended with no endorsement.

General election

Polling

Results
None of the candidates passed the threshold to be elected in the first round, necessitating several rounds of vote transfers. Betsy Hodges was elected in the 33rd round.

See also
 Minneapolis municipal elections, 2013
 Minneapolis City Council elections, 2013

Notes

References

External links
 Minneapolis Elections & Voter Services
 Elections & Voting - Minnesota Secretary of State

Official campaign websites
 Mark V. Anderson Official
 Merrill Anderson Official
 Merrill Anderson Facebook
 Mark Andrew Official
 Troy Benjegerdes Official
 Alicia K. Bennett Official
 Edmund Bernard Bruyere Official
 Bob "Again" Carney, Jr.Official
 Jackie Cherryhomes Official
 Christopher Clark Facebook
 Dan Cohen Official 
 James Everett Official
 James Everett Facebook
 Bob Fine Official
 Kurtis W. Hanna Official
 Kurtis W. Hanna Facebook
 Betsy Hodges Official
 Bill Kahn Official 
 Doug Mann Facebook
 Don Samuels Official
 Ole Savior Official
 Captain Jack Sparrow Official
 James "Jimmy" L. Stroud, Jr. Facebook
 Jeffrey Alan Wagner Facebook
 John Charles Wilson Official
 Cam Winton Official
 Stephanie Woodruff Official 
 Christopher Robin Zimmerman Official
 Christopher Robin Zimmerman Facebook

News media coverage
 2013 Minneapolis elections from the Star Tribune
 Election News from The Journal
 Election News from the Southwest Journal
 Election Minneapolis mayor from the Twin Cities Daily Planet
 Minneapolis mayor's race from Minnesota Public Radio
 Minneapolis Mayor's Race from MinnPost
 Minneapolis Mayor's Race 2013 from The UpTake

2013 Minnesota elections
Minneapolis
Local elections in Minnesota